The 2011 Scream Awards was the name of the seventh annual Scream Awards, an award show dedicated to the horror, sci-fi, and fantasy genres of feature films, television and comic books. The event was taped October 15, 2011 on the Universal Studios lot and aired as a two-hour show on October 18 on Spike.

Harry Potter and the Deathly Hallows – Part 2 and X-Men: First Class led the nominees with 14 nominations each. Other notable nominees included Captain America: The First Avenger (11 nominations), Thor (nine), True Blood (seven), Game of Thrones (seven) and AMC’s The Walking Dead (six). Voting was done by fans who visit the Spike website.

Special awards
 Comic-Con Icon Award - June Foray
 Farewell Tribute - Harry Potter
 Hero Award - Robert Downey Jr.
 Maverick Award -  Nicolas Cage
 Ultimate Villain Award - Darth Vader
 Visionary Award - Pee-Wee Herman

Online write-in awards
 Most Anticipated Movie - The Dark Knight Rises

Nominees

References

External links
Scream 2011 at Spike

Scream Awards